Aq Darreh (also Romanized as Āq Darreh; also known as Āgh Darreh and Āqdaraq) is a village in Sahandabad Rural District, Tekmeh Dash District, Bostanabad County, East Azerbaijan Province, Iran. At the 2006 census, its population was 64, in 15 families.

References 

Populated places in Bostanabad County